The  is a railway line operated by East Japan Railway Company (JR East). It connects Aomori Station and Minmaya Station on the Tsugaru Peninsula in western Aomori Prefecture.

The section of the line between Aomori Station and Naka-Oguni Station is a part of the Tsugaru-Kaikyō Line connecting Honshu and Hokkaido.

History
Plans existed to link the prefectural capital of Aomori with the northern tip of the Tsugaru Peninsula from the time of the Meiji period Railway Construction Act. In 1930, the privately held Tsugaru Railway began operations on the western side of Tsugaru Peninsula, and surveying work was completed by the Japanese Government Railways (JGR) to build a government-operated line on the eastern side of Tsugaru Peninsula. These plans were postponed by the outbreak of World War II, and were only resumed in the 1950s under the Japanese National Railways (JNR).

Additional intermediate stations were added in 1959 and 1960.

All scheduled freight operations were suspended on December 10, 1984. With the privatization of the JNR on April 1, 1987, the line came under the operational control of JR East. From March 13, 1988, the tracks between Aomori Station and the Shin Naka-Oguni Signal are jointly used by JR East, JR Hokkaido's Tsugaru-Kaikyō Line and Japan Freight Railway Company (JR Freight).

In 1988 the Aomori - Shin Naka-Oguni section was electrified in conjunction with the opening of the Seikan Tunnel and associated Tsugaru-Kaikyō Line.

Station list 

The portion from Aomori and Naka-Oguni is electrified.

See also
 List of railway lines in Japan

References
This article incorporates material from the corresponding article in the Japanese Wikipedia.
 Harris, Ken and Clarke, Jackie. Jane's World Railways 2008-2009. Jane's Information Group (2008).

External links
 JR East website 

 
Rail transport in Aomori Prefecture
Lines of East Japan Railway Company
Tsugaru-Kaikyō Line
1067 mm gauge railways in Japan
Railway lines opened in 1951